Nari Chak is a village in Hilauli block of Unnao district, Uttar Pradesh, India. As of 2011, its population is 2,129, in 363 households, and it has 3 primary schools and no healthcare facilities.

The 1961 census recorded Nari Chak as comprising 7 hamlets, with a total population of 1,037 (567 male and 470 female), in 190 households and 164 physical houses. The area of the village was given as 1,327 acres.

References

Villages in Unnao district